Midtow 
Le Bernardin is a French seafood restaurant in Midtown Manhattan, New York City. Gilbert Le Coze and his sister Maguy Le Coze started the restaurant in Paris in 1972, where it was called Les Moines de St. Bernardin. They restarted the restaurant in New York in 1986, not long after receiving a third Michelin star.

Gilbert le Coze died of a heart attack in 1994, and Éric Ripert succeeded him as chef de cuisine.

Signature dishes include kindai maguro (farmed Pacific bluefin tuna) and wagyu beef. In 2016, investigative journalists from the U.S. news program Inside Edition found that Le Bernardin, among other restaurants, was falsely marketing their beef as Kobe beef. After the report, the restaurant reworded their menu to read wagyu beef.

Awards and accolades
In 2009, Le Bernardin ranked 15th in "The World's 50 Best Restaurants"  published by Restaurant magazine. The list is compiled by polling chefs, restaurateurs, food critics, and gourmands.

Le Bernardin is one of seven restaurants in New York with three Michelin stars. It has maintained a four-star rating from The New York Times since 1986.

Outstanding Restaurant, 1998
Outstanding Chef – Eric Ripert, 2003
Outstanding Pastry Chef – Michael Laiskonis, 2007

Zagat rates Le Bernardin among the best restaurants in New York. In Zagats annual survey of restaurant patrons, Le Bernardin received the most votes of any restaurant in the city during the years 2009 to 2012. The ratings are published in a guide for the following year. In 2012, 44,306 restaurant patrons participated in the survey, and the ratings were summarized in the 2013 New York City Restaurants guide.

In 2017, Le Bernardin ranked second on La Liste, a privately published  list of the top 1,000 restaurants in the world. In 2018, La Liste ranked Le Bernardin number one in the world.

Cookbooks
Le Bernardin Cookbook: Four-Star Simplicity (1998)
A Return to Cooking (2002)
On the Line (2008)

See also
 List of French restaurants
 List of seafood restaurants
 List of Michelin 3-star restaurants in the United States
 List of Michelin starred restaurants in New York City

References

External links
 
 Behind the Line at Le Bernardin March 2011

Restaurants in Manhattan
French-American culture in New York City
French restaurants in New York City
Seafood restaurants in New York (state)
Michelin Guide starred restaurants in New York (state)
Restaurants established in 1972
Midtown Manhattan
James Beard Foundation Award winners
1972 establishments in France
1986 establishments in New York City